The Texas State Securities Board is a Texas state agency headquartered in Austin, Texas.

The Board enforces the Texas Securities Act (TEX. REV. CIV. STAT. ANN. art. 581-1) and maintains programs for enforcement, registration of securities, registration of securities dealers, investment advisers, and agents, and inspections of registered firms.

The Board has also developed and implemented an investor education program to inform the public about the basics of investing in securities with a special emphasis on the prevention and detection of securities fraud.  The agency has offices in Austin, Dallas, Houston, Lubbock, Corpus Christi, and San Antonio.

Cryptocurrency
In January 2018 the British company called BitConnect received a cease-and-desist order by the Texas State Securities Board, since they promise massive monthly returns but haven't even registered with state securities regulators or cited an office address.

References

External links 
 

State agencies of Texas